Nynäshamn Municipality (Nynäshamns kommun) is a municipality in Stockholm County in east central Sweden. Its seat is located in the city of Nynäshamn.

In 1974 the former City of Nynäshamn (itself instituted in 1946) was merged with Ösmo, from which it had been detached as a market town (köping) in 1911 and Sorunda, all in the Södertörn peninsula and adjacent islands.

Demography

Population development

Residents with a foreign background
On the 31st of December 2017 the number of people with a foreign background (persons born outside of Sweden or with two parents born outside of Sweden) was 6 082, or 21.64% of the population (28 109 on the 31st of December 2017). On the 31st of December 2002 the number of residents with a foreign background was (per the same definition) 3 178, or 12.96% of the population (24 528 on the 31st of December 2002). On 31 December 2017 there were 28 109 residents in Nynäshamn, of which 4 849 people (17.25%) were born in a country other than Sweden. Divided by country in the table below - the Nordic countries as well as the 12 most common countries of birth outside of Sweden for Swedish residents have been included, with other countries of birth bundled together by continent by Statistics Sweden.

Localities 
Grödby
Nynäshamn (seat)
Stora Vika
Sorunda
Ösmo

Public transportation 
As all municipalities in Stockholm County Nynäshamn is served by the public transport system operated by SL. There are a number of stations of Stockholm commuter rail as well as a bus network in the municipality.

There are car- and passenger ferries to the Swedish island Gotland and to Poland and Latvia.

There are over 1,800 islands and islets in the municipality. The Draget Canal allows boats to traverse the municipality from west to east without needing to pass offshore of the Landsort peninsular. Nynäshamn boasts sandy beaches, areas suitable for long walks, for riding horses and for bicycling, all popular activities. The municipality may have one of the most varying natures in the county, as it allows both activities related to the Stockholm archipelago, such as boat tours, as well as boggy grounds, agricultural areas, urban areas and even forests with elk and deer.

Its history is traced several thousands of years back. About 50 historical remains are considered notable enough to be marked on maps and attract visitors. They include both grave fields from the Iron Age, runestones from the Viking Age as well as newer curiosities such as 18th century farms and cottages.

Notable residents 
 Kent Nilsson, retired NHL hockey player
 Erik Gustafsson, NHL player for the Toronto Maple Leafs

References

External links 

Nynäshamn Municipality - Official site
Various images from Nynäshamn and surrounding areas

 
Municipalities of Stockholm County